

Buildings and structures

Buildings
 1460
 Palazzo Medici in Florence, designed by Michelozzo, is completed.
 Porto Magna in Venetian Arsenal, perhaps built by Antonio Gambello from a design by Jacopo Bellini is constructed, the first neoclassical building in Venice.
 1462 – Reconstruction of Basilica of Sant'Andrea, Mantua in Lombardy by Leon Battista Alberti begins.
 c. 1463 – Dardanelles fortresses of Kilitbahir Castle and Kale-i Sultaniye are built.
 1463–67 – Fatih Mosque, Istanbul, designed by Atik Sinan, is constructed.

 1464 – Neemrana fort in India is begun.
 1466 – Ockwells Manor in Berkshire, England, is completed.
 1466–67 – Neubrügg covered wooden bridge over the Aare between Bern and Kirchlindach is erected.
 1467 – Wongaksa Pagoda, Seoul, Korea, is built.
 1468
 Rebuilding of the Palazzo Ducale, Urbino, begun by Luciano Laurana.
 Building of Basilica della Santa Casa, Loreto, Italy, begun by Giuliano da Maiano.
 1469 – Kasımiye Medrese in Mardin, Turkey, begun before 1407, is completed.

Events
 1461: November 26 – 1461 L'Aquila earthquake in Italy; dome of Santa Maria di Collemaggio collapses for the first time.
 c.1464 – Filarete completes his Libro architettonico, a treatise on architecture and the ideal city of Sforzinda.

Births
 c.1460
 Benedetto Briosco, Italian sculptor and architect active in Lombardy (died 1514)
 Marco Palmezzano, Italian painter and architect (died 1539)
 Cristoforo Solari, Italian sculptor and architect (died 1527)
 John Wastell, English architect and master mason (died 1518)
 Bernardo Zenale, Italian painter and architect (died 1526)

Deaths
 1464 – Bernardo Rossellino, Florentine sculptor and architect (born 1409)
 1466: December 13 – Donatello, Florentine sculptor (born 1386)
 c.1469 – Filarete, Florentine architect (born c.1400)

References

Architecture